Daniel O. Hastings (1874–1966)  was a U.S. Senator from Delaware from 1928 to 1937. Senator Hastings may also refer to:

Clifford C. Hastings (1882–1946), New York State Senate
David Hastings (politician) (2000s–2010s), Maine State Senate
F. W. Hastings (1848–1935), Washington State Senate
Fred W. Hastings (1882–1932), Washington State Senate
James F. Hastings (1926–2014), New York State Senate
John A. Hastings (1900–1964), New York State Senate
Michael Hastings (politician) (born 1980), Illinois State Senate
Seth Hastings (1762–1831), Massachusetts State Senate
Thomas N. Hastings (1858–1907), New Hampshire Senate
William Soden Hastings (1798–1842), Massachusetts State Senate